The Monument to the Victims of All Wars (also Spomenik vsem žrtvam vojn (in z vojnami povezanim žrtvam na območju RS), 'Monument to the Victims of All Wars and Victims Connected with Wars in Slovenia') is a monument in Ljubljana, Slovenia.

History
The monument was commissioned in 2013 by Slovenia's Ministry of Labor, Family, Social Affairs, and Equal Opportunities to commemorate those fallen in wars and those that were affected by wars in any way. The monument is planned for installation along Šubic Street (Šubičeva cesta) and north of Star Park (Park Zvezda) at South Square (Južni trg), which had been a projected but unimplemented urban planning project. The monument is intended to be a key step in reconciliation of the Slovenian nation over divisions from the Second World War, and the space is conceived as the first step in regulating the entire area between Congress Square (Kongresni trg) and the Knafelj Passage (Knafljev prehod).

Construction
Site preparation started in June 2015, when the wall was raised between the Casino Building (Kazina) and the building at Congress Square no. 3. The display area was opened on June 23, 2015 with a temporary model of the monument enclosed in a glass display case. The permanent monument is scheduled for installation in 2016.

Vandalism
On June 18, 2015 the temporary model of the monument was vandalized with graffiti. The model was vandalized again with communist slogans and red stars on July 27, 2015 and once more on September 26, 2015 with communist slogans, red stars, and parts of a pig carcass. The monument was vandalized yet again with a political slogan on April 17, 2018.

References

External links
Javni tečaj Spomenik žrtvam vseh vojn (Public Competition: Monument to the Victims of All Wars)

Center District, Ljubljana
Monuments and memorials in Ljubljana
Vandalized works of art
World War II memorials in Slovenia